Paranecrosaurus is an extinct genus of varanoid lizards from the Eocene Messel Pits of Germany. It contains a single species, Paranecrosaurus feisti.

References 

Eocene lizards
Anguimorpha
Fossil taxa described in 2021